Rayco Rodríguez Medina (born 24 November 1996), known as Rayco Rodríguez or simply Rayco, is a Spanish footballer who plays for Unionistas de Salamanca CF as an attacking midfielder.

Club career
Born in Las Palmas, Canary Islands, Rayco represented UD Almenara, UD Las Palmas and Acodetti CF as a youth. On 6 August 2015, after impressing on a trial, he joined Real Betis and was immediately assigned to the reserves in Segunda División B.

Rayco made his senior debut on 22 August 2015, starting in a 0–1 home loss against Mérida AD. His first goal came on 4 October, but in a 2–4 loss against Real Jaén also at the Ciudad Deportiva Luis del Sol.

On 8 July 2016, Rayco moved to another reserve team, CF Pobla de Mafumet in Tercera División. On 1 December he made his first team debut, coming on as a late substitute for Elvir Maloku in a 0–3 home loss against Deportivo Alavés for the season's Copa del Rey.

On 11 July 2018, free agent Rayco signed a two-year deal with CD Lugo, being assigned to the farm team in the fourth tier. On 31 August 2020, he joined Deportivo de La Coruña's B-team also in division four.

References

External links

1996 births
Living people
Footballers from Las Palmas
Spanish footballers
Association football midfielders
Primera Federación players
Segunda División B players
Tercera División players
Betis Deportivo Balompié footballers
CF Pobla de Mafumet footballers
Gimnàstic de Tarragona footballers
Polvorín FC players
Deportivo Fabril players
Deportivo de La Coruña players
Unionistas de Salamanca CF players